Anana or Ananas or variation may refer to:

Plants
 Pineapple (Ananas comosus), also known as "anana" and "ananas" in different languages
 Ananas, a plant genus, that includes pineapple

Places
 Ananás, Tocantins, Brazil, a village
 Añana, Álava, Spain, a village and a valley
 Cuadrilla de Añana, Álava, Spain

Other uses
 Thelenota ananas, the pineapple sea cucumber, an animal
 Boletellus ananas, the pineapple bolete, a mushroom
 Physopyxis ananas, a catfish

See also
 Pineapple (disambiguation)
 Banana (disambiguation)
 A. nana (disambiguation)